Guerlain Chicherit (born 20 May 1978 in Paris) is a French rally and rallycross driver, and a professional skier who was four times world champion in freeriding (1999, 2002, 2006 and 2007).

Biography
He made his professional motorsport debut in the French Rally Cup driving a Citroën Saxo, and after a successful season in 2003 he became an official Citroën driver. In 2006, after winning the 2005 Dakar Challenge, he attended his first Dakar Rally, driving a BMW X3, and won a stage on his way to finishing 9th in the final classification.

In the 2009 Dakar Rally he suffered an accident while fighting in the general classification, and finished 9th.

Later that year, after achieving a great series of results including a 3rd place in the Tunisia Rally and wins on Rally Transibérico and UAE Desert Challenge, he won the FIA Cross Country Rally World Cup with co-driver Tina Thörner.

In the 2010 Dakar Rally, Chicherit was able to get another stage win and finish 5th in the final classification with an X-Raid BMW.

In the 2013 Dakar Rally, Chicherit won a stage and finished 8th overall driving an SMG buggy. In 2013, he also became the first driver to complete an unassisted backflip in a car.

In March 2014 Chicherit tried to break the world record for the longest car jump in Tignes, France. He crashed spectacularly on landing (which became a viral video on YouTube), but only suffered relatively minor injuries.

In August 2015 Chicherit joined JRM Racing for two events in the FIA World Rallycross Championship driving the MINI RX in the Supercar class in Loheac, France, and Franciacorta, Italy.

In 2016, Chicherit again tackled the Dakar Rally, driving an X-Raid Buggy but retiring on medical grounds following a steering related issue during SS5.  2016 also saw Chicherit rejoin the FIA World Rallycross Championship, teaming up with Monster Energy athlete Liam Doran at JRM Racing for selected events in France, Barcelona and Germany. However, a non-start for Chicherit in Loheac meant he also entered the first ever event in Riga, Latvia.

Chicherit announced plans to form his own team, GC Kompetition, driving a pair of Renault Mégane RS RXs in the 2018 FIA World Rallycross Championship. The team got a podium in its first season through Jérôme Grosset-Janin in Holjes.

2019 saw Guerlain and GC Kompetition continue its involvement in the FIA World Rallycross Championship, growing to a 5 car team by the end of the season - with 3 Renault Mégane RS RXs, and a pair of Renault Clio RS RXs making up the new GCK Academy team. Guerlain had his strongest season yet, threatening the top of the timesheets on a regular basis and sealing his best ever finish with 4th in Canada despite suffering mechanical issues in the final.

Away from sports, Chicherit is involved in property development. He has his own company, GC Kollection, which designs and builds chalets in the Alps. Guerlain has many other business ventures including GCK Energy, which won the FIA tender to power the upcoming electrification of the FIA World Rallycross Championship.

Racing record

Dakar Rally results
(key)

Complete FIA World Rallycross Championship results
(key)

Supercar/RX1/RX1e

RX2 International Series

References

External links 
 

1978 births
Living people
Dakar Rally drivers
French male skiers
French rally drivers
World Rallycross Championship drivers
Off-road racing drivers
Citroën Racing drivers